Peebinga may refer to.

 Peebinga, South Australia, a town and locality and the site of a historic railway station.
 Peebinga Conservation Park, a protected area in South Australia
 Peebinga railway line, a railway line in South Australia
 Peebinga Important Bird Area, a designation associated with the Peebinga Conservation Park
 Hundred of Peebinga, a cadastral unit in South Australia